Île aux Vaches Marines is one of many islands in the Seychelles, lying in the west shores of Mahe.
Île aux Vaches Marines is a granite rock, only slightly covered with vegetation. The island is a popular nesting site for sea-birds.
The rocks "Les Trois Dames" are not far from it but are usually hidden by heavily breaking seas.

Administration
The island belongs to Grand'Anse Mahé District.

Image gallery

References

External links 
 
 

Islands of Mahé Islands
Uninhabited islands of Seychelles